Kurt Birrenbach (July 2, 1907 – December 26, 1987) was a German politician of the Christian Democratic Union (CDU) and former member of the German Bundestag.

Life 
Birrenbach joined the CDU in 1953. Birrenbach was a member of the German Bundestag from 1957 to 1976, where he was a member of the Foreign Affairs Committee throughout. He was also a member of the European Parliament from 29 October 1959 to 29 November 1961.

Literature

References

1907 births
1987 deaths
Members of the Bundestag for North Rhine-Westphalia
Members of the Bundestag 1972–1976
Members of the Bundestag 1969–1972
Members of the Bundestag 1965–1969
Members of the Bundestag 1961–1965
Members of the Bundestag 1957–1961
Members of the Bundestag for the Christian Democratic Union of Germany
MEPs for Germany 1958–1979